The Multi-Terrain Pattern (MTP) is the standard camouflage pattern of the British Armed Forces.

As part of the British Ministry of Defence's (MOD) Personal Equipment and Common Operational Clothing (PECOC) programme, three new camouflage patterns were considered for issue to British forces. These were a revised temperate Disruptive Pattern Material (DPM) using lighter colours, a new three-colour desert pattern with enhanced utility for night-time operations, and a hybrid four colour scheme using two colours from each of the previous patterns for use on webbing in all terrains.

History
Following an Urgent Operational Requirement for a camouflage uniform for the Afghan theatre of operations, and the success of a commercially available pattern (Crye's MultiCam) when tested in trials, a decision was made to use MultiCam as the basis of a new Multi-Terrain Pattern for British armed forces, replacing the previous temperate DPM uniforms. Desert DPM uniforms were to be retained but later entirely replaced alongside Woodland DPM.

The United Kingdom's Ministry of Defence announced that HM Forces would be issued with the new British Army uniform for operations in Afghanistan with personnel serving under the 4th Mechanised Brigade; initially issued to personnel deployed on Operation Herrick from March 2010, then issued more widely to HM Forces from 2011 onward replacing all DPM including Woodland and Desert variants of the Combat Soldier 95 uniform by 2013 along with the introduction of the new Personal Clothing System.

Development

The MTP camouflage design was intended to perform consistently across a wide range of environments encountered, particularly for operations that the military had been deployed in during 2009. Initial concept was made with the environment of Helmand Province in mind.

British Troops in Afghanistan operate in a mixed landscape, including desert, woodland, mountains and urban. The development team at the Defence Science and Technology Laboratory tested various camouflage variations against the standard army disruptive pattern material and the desert DPM to determine the best balance of colours. The current HM Armed Forces camouflage were then tested alongside off-the-shelf multi-terrain camouflage. The tests were against terrain that soldiers are likely to encounter across the landscape in Afghanistan.

A wide range of camouflage colours were tried in Britain, Cyprus, Kenya and Afghanistan. Camouflage patterns were compared with in-service and commercially available patterns—including those from Crye Precision in the United States.  The trials included visual comparisons, objective assessments of the time to detect the different camouflage patterns against different backgrounds, and subjective user opinions on the efficacy of the performance.

Crye's "Multicam" pattern was determined to be the best performing, across the widest range of environments (by a significant margin) and was subsequently selected as the basis for the new British MTP camouflage, and combined with the shapes of the existing British DPM pattern. Crye designed the new pattern for the UK's MOD, with the MOD holding the licence to print the pattern. The MTP pattern itself was not tried against other patterns and its adoption was based solely on its similarity to the original Crye Multicam pattern.

In 2019, a variant of the MTP camouflage pattern was selected by the New Zealand Defence Force to replace the current issue MCU service uniform across all services by 2023. Designated NZMTP, the new camouflage has a modified colour palette better suited New Zealand's landscape.

The UK's Royal Marines announced in June 2020 that they would be procuring new uniforms specifically for the Marines, taking them away from the standard PCS uniforms of the UK forces. Also announced was that the camouflage pattern would be in Crye's Multicam, not the UK's MTP. The uniform is the off-the-shelf G4 system not sold in MTP as Crye had sold the sole production rights for MTP to the UK

Users

 : Reported to be used by Bahraini special forces commandos.
 : Frogman Corps Is known for using MTP uniforms. And have been observed in Tv documentaries.
 : Standard uniform of the Armed Forces of Malta since 2014.
: New Zealand Defence Force: NZMTP to replace current service Multi Terrain Camouflage Pattern (MCU) by 2023 
 : His Majesty's Armed Forces (Tonga).
 : Standard issue battlefield dress of the British Armed Forces and the Cadet Forces.
: Royal Bermuda Regiment, Royal Bermuda Regiment Junior Leaders.
: Cayman Islands Regiment, Cayman Islands Cadet Corps.
 : Falkland Islands Defence Force.
 : Royal Montserrat Defence Force.
 : National Guard of Ukraine seen wearing MTP uniforms supplied by Britain and local copies.
 : Pakistan: Special Service Group new standard issue CCD.

See also
Combat uniform#United Kingdom
Uniforms of the British Armed Forces

References

External links

 United States patent, number US D659,406 S for Multi-Terrain Pattern
 Official Crye Precision website

Military uniforms
Camouflage patterns
British military uniforms
Military camouflage
Military equipment introduced in the 2010s